Mateus Versolato Júnior or simply Mateus  (born April 9, 1983, in São Bernardo do Campo), is a Brazilian goalkeeper. He currently plays for Rio Claro Futebol Clube after being released by Telstar in 2010 and São Paulo in 2009.

Honours
São Paulo State League: 2005
Brazilian League: 2006

Contract
Santo André (Loan) 1 February 2008 to 30 November 2008
São Paulo 19 June 2004 to 19 June 2009

External links

 sambafoot

1983 births
Living people
Brazilian footballers
São Paulo FC players
Clube Atlético Bragantino players
Fortaleza Esporte Clube players
Esporte Clube Santo André players
Association football goalkeepers
People from São Bernardo do Campo
Footballers from São Paulo (state)
21st-century Brazilian people